The 2007 Speedway World Cup Event 1 was the first race of the 2007 Speedway World Cup season. It took place on July, 2007 in the Brandon stadium in Coventry, Great Britain.

Results

Heat details

References

See also 
 2007 Speedway World Cup
 motorcycle speedway

E2
Speedway
July 2007 sports events in the United Kingdom
2000s in Coventry